Robert Stewart (28 July 1816 – 9 June 1875) was an Australian politician.

He was born in Sydney to master mariner William Stewart and Charlotte Kirk. His father was drowned in 1820 and the family lived on Broken Bay on the Hawkesbury River until 1831, when they went to Sydney. Stewart was apprenticed as a cabinet maker, and later worked as an undertaker. Around 1843 he married Isabella Craig, with whom he had a son. In 1860 he was elected to the New South Wales Legislative Assembly for East Sydney. He retired in 1864, but returned in 1866, retiring again in 1869. He died at Sydney on the day of his wedding to Annie Carss in 1875.

References

 

1816 births
1875 deaths
Members of the New South Wales Legislative Assembly
19th-century Australian politicians